Luigi Capuano (13 July 1904 – 20 October 1979) was an Italian film director and screenwriter. Born in Naples, he directed 43 films between 1947 and 1971.

Selected filmography 

 Vertigine d'amore (1949)
 Flying Squadron (1949)
 Stormbound (1950)
 The Lovers of Ravello (1951)
 What Price Innocence? (1952)
 Beauties in Capri (1952)
 Tragic Ballad (1954)
 Letter from Naples (1954)
 New Moon (1955)
 Mermaid of Naples (1956)
 The Knight of the Black Sword (1956)
 Serenata a Maria (1957)
 Il Conte di Matera (1957)
 World of Miracles (1959)
 Queen of the Pirates (1960)
 Terror of the Red Mask (1960)
 Sword in the Shadows (1961)
 The Vengeance of Ursus (1961)
 Revenge of the Conquered (1961)
 Tiger of the Seven Seas (1962)
 The Executioner of Venice (1963)
 Zorro and the Three Musketeers (1963)
 The Lion of St. Mark (1963)
 Revenge of The Gladiators (1964)
 Sandokan to the Rescue (1964)
 Sandokan Against the Leopard of Sarawak (1964)
 Hercules and the Black Pirates (1964)
 Kidnapped to Mystery Island (1964)
 The Adventurer of Tortuga (1965)

References

External links 

1904 births
1979 deaths
Film people from Naples
Italian film directors
20th-century Italian screenwriters
Italian male screenwriters
20th-century Italian male writers